Hypera brunnipennis, the Egyptian alfalfa weevil, is a species of true weevil in the beetle family Curculionidae. The name is often misspelled as brunneipennis in the literature (e.g.).

References

Further reading

 
 

Hyperinae
Articles created by Qbugbot
Beetles described in 1834